Omoni Oboli  (born 22 April 1978) is a Nigerian actress, scriptwriter, film director, producer and digital filmmaker. She studied at the New York Film Academy and has written several screenplays, including The Figurine (2009), Anchor Baby (2010), Fatal Imagination, Being Mrs Elliott, The First Lady and Wives on Strike (2016). In 2018 she starred and directed the comedy film, Moms at War.

Early life and education 
Oboli was born in Benin City, Edo State. She is a descendant of Mosogar, a small village in Delta State, Nigeria. Omoni Oboli completed both her primary and secondary school education in Benin City, Edo State after completing her secondary school education, Omoni Oboli proceeded to University of Benin City, Edo State, Nigeria and graduated with a Bachelor's Degree in  French at the University of Benin, and graduated with 2nd Class Upper division. Following the completion of her first degree, Omoni Oboli went abroad for further studies at the New York Film Academy where she studied digital editing in a 4-week workshop.

Career 
Omoni began her movie career with her first movie role in Bitter Encounter (1996), where she played a secretary. Her next was Shame. She then went on to play the lead female character in three major movies; Not My Will, Destined To Die and Another Campus Tale. After enjoying a brief career in 1996, Omoni left the movie industry to complete her university education. She married immediately after school and did not return to the industry until a decade later. An act she said almost made her quit movie. She got back to the screen in 2009 then she realised the industry has no space for her anymore. Then she decided to start production of her own movies.

Omoni has several screenplays to her credit, including her film Wives On Strike as well as The Rivals, a movie she co-produced with her friend and won the prize for Best International Drama at the New York International Independent Film & Video Festival. It was the first Nigerian film to be premiered since the festival’s inception in 2003. The movie was given a 3-star rating out of 4 by the festival's judges. Omoni Oboli has played lead roles in mainstream films, including: The Figurine (2009), Anchor Baby (2010), Being Mrs Elliot, and Fifty (2015). She is also the first actress from Nollywood to win Best Actress in two international festivals, (that are not organized by Nigerians or Africans), in the same year (2010). This she did at the Harlem International Film Festival and the Los Angeles Movie Awards for her lead role in the movie Anchor Baby.

Awards and nominations 
In 2010, she won the award for Best Actress Narrative Feature at the Los Angeles Movie Awards, and the award for Best Actress at the Harlem International Film Festival. Omoni was nominated for the Best Actress in a leading role award at the 2011 Africa Movie Academy Awards.

In 2014, she won Big Screen Actress of the Year award, at the 2014 ELOY Awards, for her movie Being Mrs Elliott. In 2015, Omoni was awarded the Sun Nollywood "Personality of the Year", She has directed several movies such as Being Mrs Elliott, The First Lady, Wives on Strike, and Okafor's Law.

On 14 August 2017, Omoni Oboli took to her Instagram page to share a post announcing her new deal as the Brand ambassador of Olawale Ayilara's LandWey Investment Limited.

Legal issue 
Omoni Oboli starred in the movie Okafor's Law, which premiered on 24 March 2017. However, the movie could not be screened at the premiere due to an injunction by the court. Oboli was accused of copyright infringement by Jude Idada, who claimed to have written part of the script for Okafor's Law. The movie was released on 31 March 2017.

Charity 
Omoni Oboli set up a charity organization, "The Omoni Oboli Foundation" to use her celebrity status to bring relief to the plight of the less privileged women and children of Nigerian society. The foundation has been able to embark on several projects which included the  feeding of street children in Lagos.

Filmography

Awards and nominations

See also
 List of Nigerian actors
 List of Nigerian film producers

References

External links 
 

1978 births
Living people
21st-century Nigerian actresses
Actresses from Delta State
University of Benin (Nigeria) alumni
People from Benin City
Nigerian film directors
Nigerian film producers
Nigerian screenwriters
New York Film Academy alumni
Nigerian film actresses